is a railway station in Nōgata, Fukuoka Prefecture, Japan. It is on the Ita Line, operated by the Heisei Chikuhō Railway. Trains arrive roughly every 30 minutes.

Platforms

External links
Fujitana Station (Heisei Chikuhō Railway website)

References

Railway stations in Fukuoka Prefecture
Railway stations in Japan opened in 1990
Heisei Chikuhō Railway Ita Line